Armature may refer to:

 Armature (computer animation), kinematic chain used in computer animation to simulate the motions of virtual characters
 Armature (electrical), one of the two principal electrical components of an electromechanical machine
 Armature (sculpture), framework around which a sculpture is built
 Armature Studio, video game developer